Tillauti is a village in Aurangabad district, Bihar, India. The village has a population of about more than 1,000 people.

Geography
Tillauti lies between Punpun river from the west, Deohara in the south, Madar river in north, and forest in east.

Post of Tillauti is Shekhpura and the police station is in Shekhpura.

History

Local people say that this village has Nakti Bhavani temple on the banks of Madar River where many saints offer pooja to Nakti Bhavani.
During the Hindu month of Karthi, mela will be held on the banks of Madar. thousands of people come and offer their prayer.

Markets

Deohara is the local market of this village which lies 3 km from Tillauti, the village is connected with road and power supply.
Deohara is a village in Goh sub-division of the Aurangabad district.

Villages in Aurangabad district, Bihar